Villagrasa is a surname. Notable people with the surname include:

 (born 1997), Andorran footballer
María Teresa Villagrasa Pérez (born 1957), Spanish schoolteacher and politician

Spanish-language surnames